Super GT (stylized as SUPER GT) is a grand touring car racing series that began in 1993. It is the top level of sports car racing in Japan.

The series is sanctioned by the Japan Automobile Federation (JAF) and run by the GT Association (GTA). Autobacs has been the title sponsor of the series and its predecessor since 1998.

History

The JGTC years (1993–2004)

The JGTC (Japanese Grand Touring Championship) was established in 1993 by the Japan Automobile Federation (JAF) via its subsidiary company the GTA (GT Association), replacing the defunct All Japan Sports Prototype Championship for Group C cars and the Japanese Touring Car Championship for Group A touring cars, which instead would adopt the supertouring formula. Seeking to prevent the spiraling budgets and one-team/make domination of both series, JGTC imposed strict limits on power, and heavy weight penalties on race winners, in an openly stated objective to keep on-track action close with an emphasis on keeping fans happy.

Super GT (2005–present)

The JGTC had planned to hold a race during the 2005 season at the Shanghai International Circuit in China, in addition to the existing overseas round at Sepang in Malaysia. However, holding the series in more than two countries would have meant the JGTC would lose its status as a "national championship" under the International Sporting Code of the FIA, and therefore could not keep "Japanese Championship" in its name. The series would instead be classified as an "international championship" by the FIA, and would therefore require direct authorization from it, rather than the JAF.

Initially, JAF announced JGTC would be renamed "Super GT World Challenge" with the goals of "challenge to the world", and "challenge to entertainment"; however, FIA prevented JAF from using it due to confusion of the suffix with "World Championship" (a higher level FIA recognition status) and a dispute with Sports Car Club of America, which ran Speed World Challenge since 1990. On December 10, 2004, it was announced that new name of JGTC was confirmed as "Super GT". However, despite the name change and several attempts at holding a second overseas race, Super GT has continued to only hold one overseas race per year; in theory, it could regain its status as a national championship and return to JAF jurisdiction.

In 2014, Super GT and the German touring car series DTM announced the creation of Class 1, which would unify GT500's and DTM's technical regulations, allowing manufacturers to race in both series with a single specification of car. After some delays, technical regulations were fully aligned in 2020, with the GT500 category fully adopting Class One specifications. By 2021 however, DTM switched to a Group GT3 series due to massive manufacturer exodus. Super GT maintained the current technical regulations for GT500, though the "Class 1" moniker would no longer be used.

Races
Super GT races take place on well-known Japanese race tracks such as Fuji Speedway, Suzuka Circuit, and Mobility Resort Motegi. The series also races at Autopolis in the Kyushu region, Okayama International Circuit in the Chugoku region, and Sportsland Sugo in the Tohoku region. Races are typically single events between 250 and 300 kilometres' distance, with one compulsory pit stop in the middle of the race for driver changes and refuelling. In 2022, the series introduced a new longer-distance format for select races, held over 450 kilometres with two compulsory pit stops.

The series had already expanded internationally by the time it was rebranded in 2005. Sepang International Circuit in Malaysia hosted a championship round every year until 2014, when it was replaced by a new event at Chang International Circuit in Buriram, Thailand. Additional overseas races were planned to be held at Shanghai Circuit in 2005, and Yeongam International Circuit in 2013, but both events were cancelled. Buriram and Sepang were both on the 2020 provisional calendar, but both races were cancelled due to the effects of the COVID-19 pandemic. As of the 2023 season, the series has yet to stage another race outside of Japan.

The International Suzuka 1000km endurance race in late August was the longest and most prestigious event on the Super GT calendar, from 2006 when it was added as a championship round, until 2017, the final year of the event in its 1000 km format. The Suzuka 1000 km was replaced with the Intercontinental GT Challenge Suzuka 10 Hours in 2018. That year, Super GT revived the Fuji GT 500 Mile Race (805 km) as the series' new endurance round. It ran from 2018 to 2019, but was not renewed from 2020 onwards.

The Golden Week race at Fuji Speedway, held annually on May 4, is also considered to be the series' most prestigious event. Held during a major public holiday season, it regularly draws the largest crowds of any Super GT race, with a two-day attendance of 91,000 spectators in 2019. It was the first event of the first official JGTC season in 1994, and has been a permanent fixture of the series' calendar with the exception of 2004, when the circuit was closed for renovations, and 2020, due to the impact of the COVID-19 pandemic. Traditionally, this event has been run as the Fuji GT 500 km Race, but in 2022, the event was shortened to 450 km (100 laps).

Due to the effects of the 2009 energy crisis in Japan, the Fuji 500 km and Suzuka 1000 km race distances were shortened. The 2011 Tohoku earthquake and tsunami and its effects resulted in a further reduction in all race distances for the season, before standard distances were restored in 2012.

Non-championship rounds have been run sporadically during Super GT's history. The Fuji Sprint Cup was held from 2010 to 2013, consisting of two sprint races per class. The first annual Super GT x DTM Dream Race was held in November 2019, consisting of two sprint races for GT500 and DTM cars, supported by the auto sport Web Sprint Cup, two sprint races for select GT300 teams as well as one-off GT3 entries from other Japanese events.

The cars

The cars are divided into two classes: GT500 and GT300. The names of the categories derive from their traditional maximum horsepower limit – in the early years of the series, GT500 cars would have no more than 500 horsepower, GT300 cars would max out at around 300 hp. However, the current generation of GT500 engines produce in excess of 650 horsepower. Meanwhile, in present-day GT300, the horsepower range varies from around 400 to just over 550 horsepower; however, GT300 cars have far less downforce than their GT500 counterparts.

In both groups, the car number is assigned to the team, in which each team is allowed to choose whichever number they want as long as the number isn't already used by any other team. The number assigned to each team is permanent, and may only change hands when the team exits the series. The number 1 is reserved for the defending GT500 champion, and the number 0 is reserved for the reigning GT300 champion.

For easy identification, headlight covers, windshield decals, and number panels are white on GT500 cars, and yellow on GT300 cars.

GT500
The top class in Super GT, GT500, is composed entirely of manufacturer-supported teams, representing the three biggest Japanese automobile manufacturers: Toyota, Honda, and Nissan.

Since 2014, GT500 cars have been powered by single-turbocharged, inline four-cylinder engines with two liters of displacement and producing over 650 horsepower. The cars are silhouette racing cars with purpose-built carbon fibre monocoques. The advancements in aerodynamics and horsepower, combined with an ongoing tyre war driving even higher speeds, have made the GT500 class the fastest form of production-based sports car racing today. The pace of a current GT500 car is roughly equivalent to that of the fastest non-hybrid Le Mans Prototypes.

For many years, the Nissan Skyline GT-R, the Toyota Supra, and the Honda NSX represented their respective brands in GT500. Today, the three cars competing in GT500 are the Nissan GT-R (R35), the revived Toyota GR Supra, and the second-generation Honda NSX. Other models, such as the Nissan Fairlady Z, Lexus SC 430, Lexus RC F, and Lexus LC 500 have been used, as well as the Honda HSV-010 GT, a prototype car developed specifically for Super GT with its planned road-going variant having been cancelled.

In the earlier years of the GT500 category, a number of foreign manufacturers entered cars in the series, with varying success. The Porsche 911 GT2 and the BMW-powered McLaren F1 GTR are, to date, the only foreign cars to win the GT500 championship, when the former won the teams' title in 1995 and the latter won both titles in 1996. A longtail version of the F1 GTR would later score a race victory in 2001. The Ferrari F40, Porsche 911 Turbo, and Porsche 962. The last foreign-built car to enter the series was the Aston Martin DBR9, which fared poorly in its brief run in 2009 - illustrating the overwhelming advantage in raw pace that the GT500 class cars had over the FIA GT1 category cars that dominated the landscape in Europe; Team Goh, who entered the 1996 F1 GTRs, planned to enter a Maserati MC12 in 2006, but withdrew during testing for similar reasons.

In 2012, the GT500 regulations was changed in order to provide provisions for four-door vehicles, although none was run until Honda announced that the Civic Type R will replace the outgoing NSX in 2024. In 2010, front-engine, rear-wheel drive layout became the only permitted layout in the class, prompting Honda to initially replace the first generation-based NSX GT with the HSV-010. In 2014, Honda was granted a waiver to allow the NSX-Concept GT and NSX-GT (both second-generation based models) to run with a midship engine to match the road car's engine position; the waiver expired at the end of 2019 season with the implementation of Class 1 technical regulations, after which Honda was required to redesign the NSX-GT to accommodate a front-engine layout.

New GT500 cars were introduced in 2014 in preparation for the future Class 1 Touring Cars, including the first car in the class to utilize a KERS-assisted hybrid powertrain, the Honda NSX Concept-GT. Common aerodynamic regulations with the DTM were adopted, as was Class 1's turbocharged four-cylinder engine specification. Furthermore, the 2014 rules overhaul also increased the cars' downforce by 30%, while lowering costs. Aerodynamic development above a "design line" wrapping around the fenders, bumpers, and doorsills was restricted. Over sixty common parts were introduced, including the brakes, diffuser, and rear wing.

In response to increasing cornering speeds, another aerodynamic overhaul was introduced in 2017, lowering downforce by 25%. Furthermore, KERS units were banned, although the only manufacturer to utilize such systems, Honda, had already discontinued their usage in 2016. In 2020, Class 1 technical regulations were fully implemented, with the manufacturers introducing new cars to comply with the new rules. Aerodynamic development was further restricted, and a standardized ECU and suspension were introduced.

Cars

Turbocharger
The standard turbochargers were introduced from the start of 2014 season. The turbo configuration is single-turbocharged and producing the turbo boost level pressure up to  (1.9-2.2 bar higher than IndyCar Series that had  turbo boost level varies on every track). Swiss-American turbocharger company Garrett Advancing Motion which is a spin-off company of Honeywell International Inc. currently supplies exclusive turbocharger kits including wastegate for all Super GT GT500 class cars from 2014 season onwards using a 846519-15 model. The turbocharger spin rev limit spins up to 150,000 rpm but not exceeding 155,000 rpm due to higher turbo boost pressure.

GT500 specifications (2014-present)

GT300

Unlike GT500, both works-backed and independent teams compete in GT300, so the field tends to be much more varied in terms of types of cars entered. As in GT500, the major Japanese automakers participate in this class, entering cars such as the Toyota Prius and Subaru BRZ, which comply with JAF-GT regulations. However, the GT300 class is predominantly composed of GT3-class cars from European manufacturers such as Audi and Mercedes, although Lexus, Nissan and Honda are also represented in the class by GT3 cars. This reflects a growing interest in the series from European manufacturers, with Audi and BMW fielding works-supported entries. Lexus, Nissan, and Subaru also campaign works-supported cars in the class.

The GT300 class used to host more exotic cars from the likes of ASL, Mosler, Mooncraft, and Vemac (a Lotus tuner), as well as detuned GT500 cars, such as the 2004 title-winning M-TEC NSX. However, starting in 2006, teams increasingly chose to campaign European GT cars instead, a trend that accelerated in 2010 with the introduction of FIA GT cars to the series. In response to the decline of locally produced entries from specialist manufacturers, the GTA worked with Dome to create the "Mother Chassis" (:ja: マザーシャシー), a low-cost GT300 platform, with the first MC car entering the series in 2014. Mother Chassis cars utilize a standard Dome-produced tub and GTA-branded Nissan VK45DE engine, while maintaining the appearance of production cars such as the Toyota 86, Lotus Evora, and Toyota Mark X. The MC concept proved to be popular with independent teams, as well as competitive, with the Toyota 86 MC winning the GT300 championship in 2016.

Since 2006, Group GT1 and Group GT2 could race in GT300, and Group GT3 cars are able to enter GT300 since 2010 season. After the 2011 season, GTA announced GT1 and GTE cars are not eligible anymore with the intention of reducing costs, and adopted full GT3 rule.  

One of the more unique GT300 competitors was the Mooncraft Shiden MC/RT-16, a Riley Daytona Prototype-based revival of the original 1977 Mooncraft Shiden 77 (紫電77). It competed from 2006 to 2012, narrowly losing the title in 2006, and winning the championship in 2007. Front-wheel drive cars such as the Mitsubishi FTO, Toyota Celica and Cavalier, a rarity in top-level circuit racing, are further examples of unique GT300 machines. They competed in their original configurations until the early 2000s, when FWD cars were being permitted to be converted to rear-wheel drive configuration. The FWD cars were mostly unsuccessful, failing to win any championships, although a Celica won a race in 1999 after a Porsche 911 was disqualified. Rear-wheel drive cars dominated the series until 2008, when an all-wheel drive Subaru Impreza developed by Cusco won in Sepang. An open top car, Renault Sport Spider, made a one-off participation in 1997, also with lack of success.

Hybrid cars first raced in the GT300 class in 2012, when apr introduced their Toyota Prius apr GT, and Team Mugen fielded a Honda CR-Z GT. Both cars were heavily modified from their production counterparts. The Prius was powered by a 3.4 liter V8 LMP1 engine, which worked in concert with production Hybrid Synergy Drive components; the CR-Z utilized a 2.8 liter V6 LMP2 engine and a 50 kW Zytek electric motor. Both the CR-Z and Prius were mid-engined, differing from their front-engined road-going counterparts; this resulted in the CR-Z's withdrawal after the 2015 season, as new regulations for 2016 stipulated that GT300 cars' engines were to be located in the same position as in their production counterparts. However, apr took advantage of a loophole in the regulations to continue to race their mid-engine Prius until 2018, when the team was required to build a new, front-engine Prius.

The development of GT300 cars is much more regulated than that of their GT500 counterparts; the GTA works with the Stephane Ratel Organisation to balance the performance of all GT300 cars via technical adjustments in order to create close racing. While the GT3 cars in the class are closely related to production cars, the JAF-GT machines differ from production vehicles to a greater degree, and in the case of the Mother Chassis cars, share little more than a badge and exterior styling with their road-going counterparts. While engine outputs are at a lower level than the GT500 cars, the GT300 cars still post competitive times and races are relatively tight when combined with GT500 traffic. As it is becoming increasingly more difficult for GT500 cars to overtake GT300s, the GTA may review the speed difference between the two classes in the future, especially if the pace of the GT300 cars continues to increase.

Cars

GT300 specifications
Engine displacement: Free
Aspiration: Naturally-aspirated and single or twin-turbocharged
Number of cylinders: Minimum 4 but not exceeding 10 cylinders 
Allowed engine shape: Flat, Inline and V
Gearbox: 5 or 6-speed paddle shift gearbox
Power output: Various
Fuel: 102 RON unleaded gasoline
Fuel delivery: Free (direct and indirect multi-point electronic injection)
Steering: Power-assisted rack and pinion

Circuits 

 Bold denotes a current Super GT track.
 Italic denotes a former Super GT track.

Parity
Super GT is unique in its open and blunt statement that it is committed to providing exciting racing first, at the expense of runaway investment by works teams. GT500 cars are fitted with many common parts, lowering costs and equalizing the performance of those parts across all competitors. In the GT300 class, air restrictor sizes, minimum weights, ride heights, and maximum turbo boost pressures are modified on a race-to-race basis to balance performance across all cars. All adjustments to the regulations and the balance of performance are publicly accessible.

The regulations stipulate that no single driver drive over two-thirds of the race distance, which affects the timing of pit stops and driver changes, therefore preventing strategy from dominating the competition. Formerly, the regulations went further and required pit stops and driver changes be done within mandatory windows; in 2004, during an exhibition race held at Fontana, a few teams were penalised after the race ended when race officials discovered their pit stops came one lap before the mandatory window had opened.

Success Weight
Perhaps the best-known performance balancing system in use in the Super GT is its Success Ballast system, also known as Success Weight and formerly referred to as "weight handicap". Weight penalties are assigned depending on a car's performance during the race, similar to systems used in the DTM and the BTCC. The system metes out two kilograms of ballast per point scored; it formerly added ballast based on qualifying positions and individual lap times. Stickers on the cars display every car's weight handicap level. In the 2007 season, the Takata NSX team achieved a record-breaking 5 pole positions in the first 7 races, but due to the weight handicap system, they only won one race among those seven. Such regulations keep the championship in play up to the final race of the season: only two GT500 teams (ARTA in 2007 and MOLA in 2012) and one GT300 team (GAINER with André Couto in 2015) have managed to clinch a driver's championship prior to the final race.

Following repeated cases of teams and drivers not winning a single race but still winning the championship (in 2003, neither the GT500 nor GT300 champions won a single race in particular), the handicap system was changed in 2009 to combat sandbagging, discouraging a team from intentionally performing poorly in order to secure a more favorable weight handicap. The ballast is now halved in the penultimate race and lifted altogether in the final race for teams that participated in every round of the season. Teams missing only one round receive halved-ballast in the final race instead.

In 2017, the weight handicap system for GT500 cars was amended to add fuel flow restrictions. Actual weight ballast will be capped at 50 kilograms for reasons of practicality and safety. When a car's assigned ballast exceeds 50 kilograms, it will be assigned a lesser amount of weight ballast, but a fuel flow restriction will be imposed, the severity of which increases according to the size of the assigned weight handicap. While the amount of actual weight ballast carried may vary, the weight handicap stickers on the cars will continue to display the assigned weight handicap.

The drivers
Like the series, Super GT drivers are very popular in Japan with a growing international fanbase. One driver who gained international appeal is Keiichi Tsuchiya, who raced for the Taisan and ARTA teams before moving to a managerial role upon his retirement in 2004. Other drivers who were famously associated with the series and still are actively involved in Super GT through team ownership are Masahiro Hasemi, Kazuyoshi Hoshino, Aguri Suzuki, and Kunimitsu Takahashi, with the latter being a former President of the GT Association, which runs the series. The series also attracts drivers who see the series as a stepping-stone to Formula One such as Ralf Schumacher and Pedro de la Rosa, as well as former F1 drivers, most famously Érik Comas, who was the series' most successful driver until he stepped down from his position as a number one driver, and 2016 champion Heikki Kovalainen. After a one-off appearance in 2017, 2009 F1 world champion Jenson Button drove for Team Kunimitsu in 2018 and 2019, winning the 2018 title.

In the GT300 class, notable drivers include Nobuteru Taniguchi of Goodsmile Racing, who is also well known as a D1GP competitor, and Manabu Orido, a former D1GP judge currently driving for JLOC. Other well-known drivers in the category were the TV presenter and singer Hiromi Kozono and Masahiko Kondo, who was also a pop star, actor, and racer-turned-GT500 team owner. Another popular GT300 driver was Tetsuya Yamano, who runs his own driving school and took the GT300 class victory at Sepang for three consecutive years.

Champions
Overall, across all classes, 36 different drivers have won the drivers' championship in Super GT. Japan has produced the most winning drivers with 26. For the ten non-Japanese drivers who had become champions, eight of them won the drivers championship in the GT500 class while Macau driver André Couto and Brazilian driver João Paulo de Oliveira won the championship in the GT300 class.

Italian driver Ronnie Quintarelli won the most drivers championship titles with four. Quintarelli also holds the record for the most drivers championship title won by a non-Japanese driver and the most drivers championship won in GT500 class with four. Tatsuya Kataoka and Nobuteru Taniguchi were tied for the record of most drivers championship won in GT300 class with three. Tetsuya Yamano was the first driver to win multiple championship as well as the sport's first two-time champion, all of them won consecutively. Three drivers, Toranosuke Takagi in 2005, Jenson Button in 2018, and Nirei Fukuzumi in 2019 have managed to win the championship in their first full-season attempt. As of the end of the 2019 season, Masataka Yanagida and Kazuya Oshima are the only drivers in the series' history to have won the drivers championship title in both classes.

International live telecasts
[Multiverse Partners], through Haro Sports & Entertainment, undertakes the international content syndication of Autobacs Super GT 2019 Series (outside of Japan and Thailand).
 Motorsport.tv – International live streaming (except Japan) – paid access to live streams, free access to highlights.
 International live streaming (except Japan) formerly on The Race – free access.
 Astro – Malaysia live telecast on Astro SuperSport, Astro SuperSport HD and Astro GO App.
 One Sports - Philippines live telecast on One Sports, One Sports+ and SPOTV.
 Media Nusantara Citra - Indonesia live telecast on MNCTV.
 PPTV - Thailand live telecast on PPTV HD and SMM TV.
 Mediacorp - Singapore live telecast on Channel 5.

References

External links

Super GT website 

 
Sports car racing